Ann Miller (born Johnnie Lucille Collier; April 12, 1923 – January 22, 2004) was an American actress, dancer and singer. She is best remembered for her work in the Classical Hollywood cinema musicals of the 1940s and 1950s. Her early work included roles in Frank Capra's You Can't Take It with You (1938) and the Marx Bros. film Room Service (1938). She later starred in the movie musical classics Charles Walters' Easter Parade (1948), Stanley Donen's On the Town (1949) and George Sidney's Kiss Me Kate (1953). Her final film role was in David Lynch's Mulholland Drive (2001).

In 1960, Miller received a star on the Hollywood Walk of Fame. In 2017, The Daily Telegraph named her one of the best actors never to have received an Academy Award nomination.

Early life
Johnnie Lucille Collier (other sources give other birthnames, such as Lucille Collier and Lucy Ann Collier) was born in Chireno, Texas, to Clara Emma (née Birdwell) and John Alfred Collier, a criminal lawyer who represented the Barrow gang, Machine Gun Kelly, and Baby Face Nelson, among others. She was an only child. Her maternal grandmother was Cherokee. She began to take dance classes at the age of five, after suffering from  rickets. Her mother believed that these classes would help strengthen her young daughter's legs.

She lived in Houston, Texas, until she was nine, when her parents divorced, reportedly due to her father's infidelities. Her mother moved with her to Los Angeles. As her mother was deaf,  finding work was hard for her; however, because Miller looked much older than she was, she began to work as a dancer in nightclubs and supported both of them.  About this time, she adopted the stage name Ann Miller, which she kept throughout her career.

She was considered a child dance prodigy.  In an interview in a "behind the scenes" documentary on the making of the compilation film That's Entertainment! Part III (1994), she said Eleanor Powell was an early inspiration.

Career

At age 13, in 1936, Miller became a showgirl at the Bal Tabarin. She was hired as a dancer in the "Black Cat Club" in San Francisco (she reportedly told them she was 18). There, she was discovered by Lucille Ball and talent scout/comic Benny Rubin (although some sources say this occurred at Bal Tabarin).  This led Miller to be given a contract with RKO in 1936 at the age of 13 (she had also told them she was 18, and apparently provided a fake birth certificate, procured by her father – with the name "Lucy Ann Collier") and she remained there until 1940. In 1937, she played Ginger Rogers’ dancing partner in Gregory La Cava’s Stage Door. In 1938, she played the quirky, constantly dancing Essie Carmichael in the best-picture Oscar-winner, Frank Capra's You Can't Take it With You. In 1941, she signed with Columbia Pictures, where, starting with Time Out for Rhythm, she starred in 11 B movie musicals from 1941 to 1945. In July 1945, with World War II still raging in the Pacific, she posed in a bathing suit as a Yank magazine pin-up girl. She ended her contract in 1946 with one "A" film, The Thrill of Brazil. The ad in Life magazine featured Miller's leg in a stocking tied with a large red bow as the "T" in "Thrill". She finally hit her mark in Metro-Goldwyn-Mayer musicals such as Easter Parade (1948), On the Town (1949), and Kiss Me Kate (1953).

In later life, Miller claimed to have invented pantyhose in the 1940s as a solution to the continual problem of tearing stockings during the filming of dance production numbers. The common practice had been to sew hosiery to briefs. If torn, the entire garment had to be removed and resewn with a new pair. Miller asked a hosiery maker to produce a single combined garment.

Miller was famed for her speed in tap dance. Studio publicists concocted press releases claiming she could tap 500 times per minute, but, in truth, the sound of ultra-fast "500" taps was looped in later. Because the stage floors were waxed and too slick for regular tap shoes, she had to dance in shoes with rubber treads on the sole. Later, she would loop the sound of the taps while watching the film and actually dancing on a "tap board" to match her steps in the film.

She was known later in life for her distinctive appearance, which reflected a studio-era ideal of glamour: massive black bouffant hair, heavy makeup with a splash of crimson lipstick, and fashions that emphasized her lithe figure and long dancer's legs.

Her film career effectively ended in 1956 as the studio system lost steam to television, but she remained active in the theater and on television. In 1969, she starred on Broadway in the musical Mame, in which she wowed the audience in a tap number created just for her. 1971 found her starring in an iconic television commercial for “The Great American Soup” (created by Stan Freberg), with Miller rising up out of the floor on top of an eight-foot high cylinder designed to look like a giant soup can. The ad was a spectacular song and dance number in the tradition of the movie extravaganzas which were her stock in trade. In 1979, she astounded audiences in the Broadway show Sugar Babies with fellow MGM veteran Mickey Rooney, which toured the United States extensively after its Broadway run. In 1983, she won the Sarah Siddons Award for her work in Chicago theatre.

She appeared in a special 1982 episode of The Love Boat, joined by fellow showbiz legends Ethel Merman, Carol Channing, Della Reese, Van Johnson and Cab Calloway in a storyline that cast them as older relatives of the show's regular characters. Her last stage performance was a 1998 Paper Mill Playhouse production of Stephen Sondheim's Follies, in which she played hard-boiled Carlotta Campion and received rave reviews for her rendition of the song "I'm Still Here". At the age of 63, Miller sang and tap danced to "42nd Street" at the opening of the Disney MGM Studios on May 1, 1989. This would be her last live dance performance.

She was the subject of This Is Your Life on British television in 1993 when she was surprised by Michael Aspel at the studios of CBS Television City, Hollywood.

Miller appeared as a dance instructor in Home Improvement episode "Dances with Tools" (1993) Between 1995 and 2001, Molly Shannon parodied Miller several times on Saturday Night Live in a recurring sketch titled "Leg-Up!" In 2001, she took her last role, playing "Coco" in director David Lynch's critically acclaimed Mulholland Drive.

Outside of acting, she published two books. Her first book was an autobiography, Miller's High Life (1972). Her second book was Tapping into the Force (1990), about her experiences in the psychic world.

Personal life
Miller married three times, to Reese Llewellyn Milner in 1946, to William Moss in 1958, and to Arthur Cameron in 1961, and in between marriages dated such well-known men as Howard Hughes, and Conrad Hilton. During her marriage to Reese Llewellyn Milner, while pregnant with daughter Mary in her last trimester, she was thrown down the stairs by Milner and went into early labor. Her baby Mary lived only three hours on November 12, 1946.

Death
Miller died, aged 80, from lung cancer on January 22, 2004, and her remains were interred in Holy Cross Cemetery in Culver City, California.

For her contribution to the motion-picture industry, Miller has a star on the Hollywood Walk of Fame at 6914 Hollywood Boulevard. In 1998, a Golden Palm Star on the Palm Springs, California, Walk of Stars was dedicated to her. To honor Miller's contribution to dance, the Smithsonian Institution displays her favorite pair of tap shoes, which she playfully nicknamed "Moe and Joe".

Work

Film

Television

Theatre

Awards and nominations 

On February 8, 1960, Miller received a Star on the Hollywood Walk of Fame at 6914 Hollywood Blvd.

See also 
 List of dancers

References

Further reading
 Miller, Ann, Miller's High Life. Doubleday, 1972. .
 Oderman, Stuart, Talking to the Piano Player 2. BearManor Media, 2009. .

External links

 
 
 
 Profile @ Turner Classic Movies
 
 Photos of Ann Miller from 'Eadie Was A Lady' by Ned Scott

1923 births
2004 deaths
20th-century American actresses
20th-century American singers
20th-century American women singers
21st-century American actresses
Actresses from Houston
American child actresses
American female dancers
American film actresses
American musical theatre actresses
American people of Cherokee descent
American Shakespearean actresses
American stage actresses
American tap dancers
Burials at Holy Cross Cemetery, Culver City
California Republicans
Catholics from Texas
Columbia Pictures contract players
Dancers from Texas
Deaths from lung cancer in California
Metro-Goldwyn-Mayer contract players
Musicians from Houston
People from Harris County, Texas
RKO Pictures contract players
Singers from Texas